Ait Daoud is a town in Essaouira Province, Marrakesh-Safi, Morocco. According to the 2004 census it has a population of 2,497.

References

Populated places in Essaouira Province
Municipalities of Morocco